Xalko is a Canadian documentary film, directed by Sami Mermer and Hind Benchekroun and released in 2018. The film profiles Mermer's own birthplace of Xalko, a Kurdish village in Turkey where the women are preserving Kurdish tradition after most of the men have left as refugees from the Kurdish–Turkish conflict.

The film premiered in November 2018 at the Montreal International Documentary Festival. It won the Prix Iris for Best Documentary Film at the 22nd Quebec Cinema Awards in 2020, and Mermer received a nomination for Best Cinematography in a Documentary.

References

External links

2018 films
Canadian documentary films
Quebec films
2010s Canadian films
Best Documentary Film Jutra and Iris Award winners